Tove Bryn (a.k.a. Tove Trollstugo, November 27, 1903 – June 24, 1983) was a Norwegian actress.

Bryn had her film debut in 1920 in Gustav Adolf Olsen's Kaksen paa Øverland, in which she played the role of a huldra. In the 1930s and 1940s she appeared in three films directed by Rasmus Breistein: Ungen (1938, as Petrina), Hu Dagmar (1939, as Marte-Maja), and Gullfjellet (1941, as Olaug Benningstad).

Tove Bryn was the second wife of the actor, film director, and theater director Ingjald Haaland.

Filmography
1920: Kaksen paa Øverland as a hulder
1938: Ungen as Petrina
1939: Hu Dagmar as Marte-Maja
1941: Gullfjellet as Olaug Benningstad

References

External links
 

1903 births
1983 deaths
Norwegian film actresses
20th-century Norwegian actresses